Leonel Justiniano Arauz (born 2 July 1992), is a Bolivian professional footballer who plays as a central midfielder for Bolívar.

International goals
Scores and results list Bolivia's goal tally first.

References

External links

1992 births
Living people
Bolivian footballers
Bolivia international footballers
Association football midfielders
Bolivian Primera División players
Club Bolívar players
Sportspeople from Santa Cruz de la Sierra
2019 Copa América players
2021 Copa América players